The 2019 Metro Atlantic Athletic Conference men's basketball tournament was the postseason men's basketball tournament for the Metro Atlantic Athletic Conference for the 2018–19 NCAA Division I men's basketball season. It was held from March 7–11, 2019 at the Times Union Center in Albany, New York. This marked the 20th time the tournament was played at the Times Union Center. No. 1 seed Iona defeated No. 6 seed Monmouth in the championship game 81–60 to win the conference's automatic bid to the 2019 NCAA tournament. With the win, Iona became the first MAAC team to win four consecutive MAAC Tournament championships, while also making this their MAAC-record leading seventh consecutive championship game appearance. Monmouth was the second consecutive No. 6 seed to make the championship game in the tournament, and fourth overall.

Seeds
All 11 teams in the conference participate in the Tournament. The top five teams receive byes to the quarterfinals. Teams were seeded by record within the conference, with a tiebreaker system to seed teams with identical conference records.

Schedule

Bracket

Game summaries

First round

Quarterfinals

Semifinals

Championship

Team and tournament leaders

Team leaders

All-championship team

See also
 2019 MAAC women's basketball tournament

References

MAAC men's basketball tournament
Tournament
Basketball competitions in Albany, New York
MAAC men's basketball tournament
MAAC men's basketball tournament
College basketball tournaments in New York (state)